This is a list of the mammal species recorded in Bangladesh. There are eighty-nine mammal species in Bangladesh, of which three are critically endangered, twelve are endangered, sixteen are vulnerable, and four are near threatened.

The following tags are used to highlight each species' conservation status as assessed by the International Union for Conservation of Nature:

Order: Artiodactyla (even-toed ungulates) 

The even-toed ungulates are ungulates whose weight is borne about equally by the third and fourth toes, rather than mostly or entirely by the third as in perissodactyls. There are about 220 artiodactyl species, including many that are of great economic importance to humans.
Family: Bovidae (cattle, antelope, sheep, goats)
Subfamily: Bovinae
Genus: Bos
Gaur, B. gaurus 
Subfamily: Caprinae
Genus: Capricornis
Mainland serow, C. sumatraensis 
Family: Cervidae (deer)
Subfamily: Cervinae
Genus: Axis
Chital, A. axis 
Indian hog deer, A. porcinus 
Genus: Rusa
Sambar deer, R. unicolor 
Subfamily: Muntiacinae
Genus: Muntiacus
Indian muntjac, M. muntjak 
Family: Suidae (pigs)
Subfamily: Suinae
Genus: Sus
Wild boar, S. scrofa

Order: Carnivora (carnivorans) 

There are over 260 species of carnivorans, the majority of which eat meat as their primary dietary item. They have a characteristic skull shape and dentition.
Suborder: Feliformia
Family: Felidae (cats)
Subfamily: Felinae
Genus: Catopuma
Asian golden cat, C. temminckii 
Genus: Felis
Jungle cat, F. chaus 
Genus: Pardofelis
Marbled cat, P. marmorata 
Genus: Prionailurus
Leopard cat, P. bengalensis 
Fishing cat, P. viverrinus 
Subfamily: Pantherinae
Genus: Neofelis
Clouded leopard, N. nebulosa 
Genus: Panthera
Leopard, P. pardus 
Indian leopard, P. p. fusca
Tiger, P. tigris 
Bengal tiger, P. t. tigris
Family: Viverridae
Subfamily: Paradoxurinae
Genus: Arctictis
Binturong, A. binturong 
Genus: Arctogalidia
Small-toothed palm civet, A. trivirgata 
Genus: Paguma
Masked palm civet, P. larvata 
Genus: Paradoxurus
Asian palm civet, P. hermaphroditus 
Subfamily: Viverrinae
Genus: Viverra
Large Indian civet, V. zibetha 
Genus: Viverricula
Small Indian civet, V. indica 
Family: Herpestidae (mongooses)
Genus: Urva
Small Indian mongoose, U. auropunctata 
Indian grey mongoose, U. edwardsii 
Crab-eating mongoose, U. urva 
Suborder: Caniformia
Family: Canidae (dogs, foxes)
Genus: Canis
Golden jackal, C. aureus 
Genus: Cuon
Dhole, C. alpinus 
Genus: Vulpes
Bengal fox, V. bengalensis 
Red fox, V. vulpes 
Family: Ursidae (bears)
Genus: Helarctos
Sun bear, H. malayanus 
Genus: Ursus
Asiatic black bear, U. thibetanus 
Family: Mustelidae (weasels)
Genus: Aonyx
Asian small-clawed otter, A. cinereus 
Genus: Arctonyx
Northern hog badger, A. albogularis 
Greater hog badger, A. collaris 
Genus: Lutra
Eurasian otter, L. lutra 
Genus: Lutrogale
Smooth-coated otter, L. perspicillata 
Genus: Martes
Yellow-throated marten, M. flavigula 
Genus: Melogale
Burmese ferret badger, M. personata

Order: Cetacea (whales) 

The order Cetacea includes whales, dolphins and porpoises. They are the mammals most fully adapted to aquatic life with a spindle-shaped nearly hairless body, protected by a thick layer of blubber, and forelimbs and tail modified to provide propulsion underwater.
Suborder: Mysticeti
Family: Balaenopteridae
Subfamily: Balaenopterinae
Genus: Balaenoptera
 Common minke whale, B. acutorostrata 
 Bryde's whale, B. brydei 
 Eden's whale, B. edeni 
 Blue whale, B. musculus 
 Fin whale, B. physalus 
Subfamily: Megapterinae
Genus: Megaptera
 Humpback whale, M. novaeangliae 
Suborder: Odontoceti
Family: Physeteridae
Genus: Physeter
 Sperm whale, P. macrocephalus 
Superfamily: Platanistoidea
Family: Platanistidae
Genus: Platanista
Ganges river dolphin, P. gangetica 
Family: Phocoenidae
Genus: Neophocaena
 Finless porpoise, N. phocaenoides 
Family: Delphinidae (marine dolphins)
Genus: Feresa
 Pygmy killer whale, F. attenuata 
Genus: Globicephala
 Pilot whale, G. macrorhynchus 
Genus: Grampus
 Risso's dolphin, G. griseus 
Genus: Lagenodelphis
 Fraser's dolphin, L. hosei 
Genus: Orcaella
Irrawaddy dolphin, O. brevirostris 
Genus: Peponocephala
 Melon-headed whale, P. electra 
Genus: Pseudorca
 False killer whale, P. crassidens 
Genus: Stenella
 Pantropical spotted dolphin, S. attenuata 
 Spinner dolphin, S. longirostris 
Genus: Steno
 Rough-toothed dolphin, S. bredanensis 
Genus: Sousa
 Indo-Pacific humpbacked dolphin, S. chinensis 
Genus: Tursiops
 Indo-Pacific bottlenose dolphin, T. aduncus 
 Bottlenose dolphin, T. truncatus

Order: Chiroptera (bats) 

The bats' most distinguishing feature is that their forelimbs are developed as wings, making them the only mammals capable of flight. Bat species account for about 20% of all mammals.

Family: Pteropodidae (flying foxes, Old World fruit bats)
Subfamily: Pteropodinae
Genus: Cynopterus
 Greater short-nosed fruit bat, C. sphinx 
Genus: Pteropus
Indian flying fox, P. giganteus 
Family: Vespertilionidae
Subfamily: Myotinae
Genus: Myotis
 Lesser mouse-eared bat,  M. blythii 
 Whiskered myotis, M. muricola 
 Himalayan whiskered bat, M. siligorensis 
Subfamily: Vespertilioninae
Genus: Pipistrellus
 Indian pipistrelle, P. coromandra 
Genus: Scotoecus
 Desert yellow bat, Scotoecus pallidus 
Genus: Scotophilus
 Lesser Asiatic yellow bat, Scotophilus kuhlii 
Genus: Scotozous
 Dormer's pipistrelle, Scotozous dormeri 
Genus: Tylonycteris
 Lesser bamboo bat, Tylonycteris pachypus 
Subfamily: Miniopterinae
Genus: Miniopterus
 Small bent-winged bat, Miniopterus pusillus 
Family: Rhinopomatidae
Genus: Rhinopoma
 Lesser mouse-tailed bat, Rhinopoma hardwickei 
 Greater mouse-tailed bat, Rhinopoma microphyllum 
Family: Molossidae
Genus: Chaerephon
 Wrinkle-lipped free-tailed bat, Chaerephon plicata 
Family: Emballonuridae
Genus: Saccolaimus
 Naked-rumped pouched bat, Saccolaimus saccolaimus 
Genus: Taphozous
 Long-winged tomb bat, Taphozous longimanus 
Family: Rhinolophidae
Subfamily: Rhinolophinae
Genus: Rhinolophus
 Intermediate horseshoe bat, Rhinolophus affinis 
Subfamily: Hipposiderinae
Genus: Coelops
 Tail-less leaf-nosed bat, Coelops frithii 
Genus: Hipposideros
 Dusky roundleaf bat, Hipposideros ater 
 Indian roundleaf bat, Hipposideros lankadiva 
 Intermediate roundleaf bat, Hipposideros larvatus

Order: Lagomorpha (lagomorphs) 

The lagomorphs comprise two families, Leporidae (hares and rabbits), and Ochotonidae (pikas). Though they can resemble rodents, and were classified as a superfamily in that order until the early 20th century, they have since been considered a separate order. They differ from rodents in a number of physical characteristics, such as having four incisors in the upper jaw rather than two.
Family: Leporidae (rabbits, hares)
Genus: Caprolagus
Hispid hare, C. hispidus  presence uncertain
Genus: Lepus
Indian hare, L. nigricollis

Order: Pholidota (pangolins) 

The order Pholidota comprises the eight species of pangolin. Pangolins are anteaters and have the powerful claws, elongated snout and long tongue seen in the other unrelated anteater species.
Family: Manidae
Genus: Manis
Indian pangolin, M. crassicaudata 
Sunda pangolin, M. javanica 
Chinese pangolin, M. pentadactyla

Order: Primates 

The order Primates contains humans and their closest relatives: lemurs, lorisoids, monkeys, and apes.
Suborder: Strepsirrhini
Infraorder: Lemuriformes
Superfamily: Lorisoidea
Family: Lorisidae (lorises, bushbabies)
Genus: Nycticebus
Bengal slow loris, N. bengalensis 
Sunda slow loris, N. coucang 
Suborder: Haplorhini
Infraorder: Simiiformes
Parvorder: Catarrhini
Superfamily: Cercopithecoidea
Family: Cercopithecidae (Old World monkeys)
Genus: Macaca
Stump-tailed macaque, M. arctoides }
Assam macaque, M. assamensis 
 Crab-eating macaque, M. fascicularis 
 Northern pigtail macaque, M. leonina 
Rhesus macaque, M. mulatta 
Subfamily: Colobinae
Genus: Semnopithecus
Northern plains gray langur, S. entellus 
Genus: Trachypithecus
Dusky leaf monkey, T. obscurus  
Phayre's leaf monkey, T. phayrei 
 Bonneted langur, T. pileatus 
Superfamily: Hominoidea
Family: Hylobatidae (gibbons)
Genus: Hoolock
Western hoolock gibbon, H. hoolock

Order: Proboscidea (elephants) 

The elephants comprise three living species, and are the largest living land animals.
Family: Elephantidae (elephants)
Genus: Elephas
 Asian elephant, E. maximus

Order: Rodentia (rodents) 

Rodents make up the largest order of mammals, with over 40% of mammalian species. They have two incisors in the upper and lower jaw which grow continually and must be kept short by gnawing. Most rodents are small though the capybara can weigh up to 45 kg (100 lb).
Family: Hystricidae (Old World porcupines)
Genus: Atherurus
 Asiatic brush-tailed porcupine, A. macrourus 
Genus: Hystrix
Malayan porcupine, H. brachyura 
Suborder: Sciurognathi
Family: Sciuridae (squirrels)
Subfamily: Ratufinae
Genus: Ratufa
 Black giant squirrel, R. bicolor 
Subfamily: Sciurinae
Tribe: Pteromyini
Genus: Hylopetes
 Particolored flying squirrel, H. alboniger 
Genus: Petaurista
 Bhutan giant flying squirrel, P. nobilis 
Subfamily: Callosciurinae
Genus: Callosciurus
Irrawaddy squirrel, C. pygerythrus 
Family: Spalacidae
Subfamily: Rhizomyinae
Genus: Cannomys
 Lesser bamboo rat, C. badius 
Family: Muridae (mice, rats, voles, gerbils, hamsters, etc.)
Subfamily: Murinae
Genus: Bandicota
 Lesser bandicoot rat, B. bengalensis 
Genus: Leopoldamys
 Long-tailed giant rat, L. sabanus 
Genus: Millardia
 Soft-furred rat, M. meltada 
Genus: Nesokia
 Short-tailed bandicoot rat, N. indica 
Genus: Niviventer
 Chestnut white-bellied rat, N. fulvescens 
Genus: Rattus
 Polynesian rat, R. exulans 
 Himalayan field rat, R. nitidus 
 Tanezumi rat, R. tanezumi 
Genus: Vandeleuria
 Asiatic long-tailed climbing mouse, V. oleracea

Order: Sirenia (manatees and dugongs) 

Sirenia is an order of fully aquatic, herbivorous mammals that inhabit rivers, estuaries, coastal marine waters, swamps, and marine wetlands. All four species are endangered.

Family: Dugongidae
Genus: Dugong
Dugong, D. dugon

Order: Soricomorpha (shrews) 

The "shrew-forms" are insectivorous mammals. The shrews and solenodons closely resemble mice while the moles are stout-bodied burrowers.
Family: Soricidae (shrews)
Subfamily: Crocidurinae
Genus: Crocidura
 Southeast Asian shrew, C. fuliginosa 
Genus: Suncus
Asian house shrew, S. murinus 
 Anderson's shrew, S. stoliczkanus

Locally extinct 
The following species are locally extinct in the country:
 Blackbuck, Antilope cervicapra since the end of the 19th century
 Banteng, Bos javanicus since the 1940s	
 Nilgai, Boselaphus tragocamelus since the 1930s
Wild water buffalo, Bubalus arnee since the 1940s
Gray wolf, Canis lupus since the mid 20th century
 Sumatran rhinoceros, Dicerorhinus sumatrensis since the 1930s
 Sloth bear, Melursus ursinus since the early 21st century
 Pygmy hog, Porcula salvanius
 Javan rhinoceros, Rhinoceros sondaicus since the 1930s
 Indian rhinoceros, Rhinoceros unicornis since the 1930s
 Barasingha, Rucervus duvaucelii since the 1950s

See also
Wildlife of Bangladesh
Fauna of Bangladesh
List of chordate orders
Lists of mammals by region
Mammal classification

References

External links

.
Mammals
Bang
 Bang
Bangladesh